In probability theory, Novikov's condition is the sufficient condition for a stochastic process which takes the form of the Radon–Nikodym derivative in Girsanov's theorem to be a martingale. If satisfied together with other conditions, Girsanov's theorem may be applied to a Brownian motion stochastic process to change from the original measure to the new measure defined by the Radon–Nikodym derivative.

This condition was suggested and proved by Alexander Novikov. There are other results which may be used to show that the Radon–Nikodym derivative is a martingale, such as the more general criterion Kazamaki's condition, however Novikov's condition is the most well-known result.

Assume that

If the condition

 

is fulfilled then the process

 

is a martingale under the probability measure  and the filtration . Here  denotes the Doléans-Dade exponential.

References

External links
 

Martingale theory